The 2021 Limerick Premier Intermediate Hurling Championship was the eighth staging of the Limerick Premier Intermediate Hurling Championship since its establishment by the Limerick County Board in 2014. The championship began on 3 September 2021 and ended on 24 October 2021.

The final was played on 24 October 2021 at the TUS Gaelic Grounds in Limerick, between Mungret/St. Paul's and Cappamore, in what was their first ever meeting in a final. Mungret/St. Paul's won the match by 4-17 to 1-12 to claim their first championship title in the grade.

Liam Lynch was the championship's top scorer with 2-44.

Team changes

To Championship

Relegated from the Limerick Senior Hurling Championship
 Murroe-Boher

Promoted from the Limerick Intermediate Hurling Championship
 Newcastle West

From Championship

Promoted to the Limerick Senior Hurling Championship
 Kildimo-Pallaskenry

Relegated to the Limerick Intermediate Hurling Championship
 Bruree

Results

Group 1

Group 1 table

Group 1 results

Group 2

Group 2 table

Group 2 results

Relegation section

Playoff

Knockout stage

Semi-finals

Final

Championship statistics

Top scorers

Overall

In a single game

References

External links

 Limerick GAA website

Limerick Premier Intermediate Hurling Championship
Limerick Premier Intermediate Hurling Championship